Dianthiphos bernardoi is a species of sea snail, a marine gastropod mollusk in the family Pisaniidae.

Description

Distribution

References

 Costa P.M.S. & Gomes R.S. (1998). A new Species of Pisania Bivona, 1832 (Mollusca, Gastropods, Prosobranchia) to Brazilian coast. Siratus, 3 (14): 15–17

External links

Pisaniidae
Gastropods described in 1998